The  thick lipped chub (Squalius cephaloides) is a species of cyprinid fish known only from the Armutlu Peninsula in Turkey.

References

Squalius
Fish described in 1942
Taxonomy articles created by Polbot